Dolly Earnshaw de Leon (born 1968 or 1969) is a Filipino film, television, and theater actress. She is best known for her roles in the films Verdict, Historya ni Ha, and gained international recognition for the Palme d'Or-winning Triangle of Sadness. For her performance in Triangle of Sadness, she became the first Filipino actor to be nominated at the BAFTAs and Golden Globe Awards.

In May 2022, de Leon signed with U.S.-based artist agency Fusion Entertainment. A FAMAS Award and LA Film Critics Award winner, de Leon has an extensive stage experience and a BA in theater arts from the University of the Philippines. She is also a trained actress who has been in more than 30 stage productions and won numerous awards for her performances. In 2023, British Vogue listed de Leon among "30 of the world's most famous stars."

Early life and career 
Dolly de Leon was born and raised in Manila to parents with roots from Ilocos and the Visayas. She attended at University of the Philippines Diliman, where she was mentored by the late National Artist for Theater Tony Mabesa, and finished with a Bachelor of Arts in Theater in 1995. She then started acting for soap operas, then moved to film. Her first film credit was in Shake, Rattle, and Roll III in 1991. In an interview with Variety, de Leon described theater as her "first love."

For decades, de Leon has played a number of parts, mostly bit roles, in the Philippines. De Leon has also worked with noted Filipino directors, including Lav Diaz, Erik Matti, and Antoinette Jadaone.

In 2018, she auditioned without an agent and got the part for a role in the international film Triangle of Sadness, written and directed by Ruben Östlund. The film screened at the 2022 Cannes Film Festival, where it won the Palme d'Or. Her role, which Variety described as "scene-stealing," is widely considered as her breakout role, locally and internationally, described by Deadline as "long-overdue." de Leon consequently signed with Fusion Entertainment for management across all areas, as well as with Gersh.

Her performance in Triangle of Sadness earned her critical acclaim, winning the Los Angeles Film Critics Association award for best supporting performer, the first actor to receive the award along with Ke Huy Quan, and a runner-up for best supporting actress at the National Film Society of Film Critics. She also became the first Filipino actor to be nominated at the BAFTAs and Golden Globe Awards after receiving nominations for best supporting actress.

Selected filmography

Web series 
 The Kangks Show (2022) as Mrs. Daks Chaser

Awards and nominations

References

External links 

 
 

Living people
Filipino television actresses
Filipino film actresses
Year of birth missing (living people)
University of the Philippines Diliman alumni
GMA Network personalities
ABS-CBN personalities
Filipino people of English descent